Robert W. Foy (March 13, 1916 – March 25, 1950) was a United States Army Air Forces fighter pilot and triple-ace during World War II.

See also
Chuck Yeager
Bud Anderson
Leonard K. Carson
John B. England

References

1916 births
1950 deaths
American World War II flying aces
Aviators from New York (state)
Aviators killed in aviation accidents or incidents in the United States
Recipients of the Silver Star
United States Army Air Forces officers
United States Army Air Forces pilots of World War II
Victims of aviation accidents or incidents in 1950